Victor Frederick Buckingham (23 October 1915 – 26 January 1995) was an English football player and manager.

He played for the then second division side Tottenham Hotspur. As manager he won the 1953–54 FA Cup with West Bromwich Albion and finished runners-up in the Football League First Division. He had two periods as manager of AFC Ajax, leading the side to the Dutch Championship of 1960. In 1964 Johan Cruyff made his league debut under him. 

In 1971, Buckingham's FC Barcelona side finished as league runners-up and won the Spanish Cup. He also held manager positions with Fulham, Sheffield Wednesday and in Greece. Buckingham is considered to have been a pioneer of the footballing philosophy known as Total Football, later further developed by his protégé Johan Cruyff.

Career 
Buckingham joined Tottenham Hotspur in 1934 and played the first season (1934–35) for Tottenham Hotspur nursery club Northfleet United. After that single season he returned to Tottenham, then playing in the Second Division, where he accumulated 230 matches as a defensive midfielder and later defender before leaving in 1949.

He started his managerial career at Oxford University 1949–50. After this, he headed the joint amateur team of Oxford and Cambridge Universities, Pegasus with which he won in 1951 the FA Amateur Cup, defeating Bishop Auckland in the final 2–1 in front of a crowd of 100,000 in Wembley Stadium, playing an "attractive push-and-run style of football where they worked hard for one another, kept it simple and passed the ball quickly".

Between 1951 and 1953 he managed Bradford Park Avenue, then playing in the Third Division North of the  Football League, reaching upper midtable places.

In 1953 he was hired at West Bromwich Albion as successor to Jesse Carver who returned to Italy. He became the club's longest-serving post-war manager, almost leading them to a since 1897 elusive "double" in 1954 when they won the FA Cup, defeating Preston North End around Tom Finney 3–2, and finished second in the league.

In 1959 he became manager of Ajax, following the Austrian Karl Humenberger in the dugout. There he won the 1959–60 Eredivisie. For personal reasons he left the club at the end of May 1960, a couple of weeks before the end of the 1960–61 season. With the only 28-year-old Keith Spurgeon, who was recommended to Ajax by the English FA, another Englishman, the sixth in the history of the club, became trainer of Ajax. He would stay until the end of the following season.

Initially, it was rumored Buckingham might join Plymouth Argyle, but he ended up at Sheffield Wednesday, runner-up in the championship of 1960–61, where he replaced Harry Catterick who was lured to Everton two games before the end of the season. Under Buckingham's management, Sheffield Wednesday finished in sixth place in three consecutive seasons. On 9 April 1964, he was sacked from his 3,000 pound a year job with the club. Jack Mansell, who was suspended by Buckingham from the first team's coaching staff, replaced him for the time being.

Buckingham was never thought to be personally involved in the British betting scandal of 1964, which was revealed on 12 April 1964, however the club management alleged in the aftermath, that lax discipline under him may have played a role. Three of his players at Wednesday – Peter Swan, Tony Kay and David Layne – were accused of taking bribes to fix a match with Ipswich Town on 1 December 1962 and betting on their team to lose, which then lost 2–0.

For the 1964–65 season he returned to Ajax. This time, the only success was the league debut of the 17-year-old Johan Cruijff in November. Poor results, including a 9–4 defeat in Rotterdam to SC Feijenoord, saw Ajax close to the relegation zone. By January 1965, Buckingham had left the club. In Amsterdam, this was the beginning of the era of Rinus Michels.

In later years Johan Cruijff would speak about Vic Buckingham and Keith Spurgeon:"They were open-minded but, tactically, you have to see where we were at that time. Football in Holland then was good but it was not really professional. They gave us some professionalism because they were much further down the road. But the tactical thinking came later with Michels. It started then."

Back in England, Buckingham joined first division side Fulham FC in January 1965. The club was struggling at the time and were later relegated in 1968. It is said that the purchase of Allan Clarke from Walsall was one of his best decisions in that time. With 45 goals in 86 matches until 1968, Clarke contributed to the club staying up as long as it did and after relegation he was sold for £150,000, then the record British transfer fee.

After a brief stint in Greece he was hired in 1969 by FC Barcelona in Spain. There he won the Spanish Cup, the Copa del Generalísimo of 1970–71, in a 4–3 win after extra time against Valencia CF in the final. In the same season Barcelona were runner up in the league, behind Valencia. They were equal on points, but Valencia prevailed due to the results of the matches against each other: Barça lost 2–0 at home and drew 1–1 away. After this season it was once more that Rinus Michels replaced him. Amongst the stars of this Barcelona side were Joaquim Rifé, Carles Rexach, Josep Fusté and Juan Manuel Asensi.

In February 1972 he joined Sevilla FC, but was unable to avoid relegation with the club. Thereafter he had two more engagements in Greece. When he was hired by Greek champions Olympiacos in 1975 he finished the season to 1976 in third place and did not gain an extension to his contract. His last job was with AS Rodos, another Greek first division side, where he joined at the beginning of the 1979–80 season. The team was relegated at the end of the season.

Personal life
Vic was born in Greenwich, the son of Annie Elizabeth Jenkins and William George Buckingham. He was married to Lilian Emma King and had three children. He died aged 79 in Chichester, England.

Managerial statistics

Managerial honours
West Bromwich Albion
 Football League First Division runner-up: 1953–54
 FA Cup: 1954
 FA Charity Shield: 1954 (shared with Wolverhampton Wanderers)

Ajax
 Eredivisie: 1959–60; runner-up 1960–61

Barcelona
 Copa del Generalísimo: 1970–71
 Primera División runner-up: 1970–71

References

External links

If not indicated differently, club movements, league positions, results, etc. were taken from the profile page of Vic Buckingham on worldfootball.net and pages linked from there as available on 2020-03-01. Further information was taken from
 
Short biography from the Sheffield Wednesday archive

1915 births
1995 deaths
Footballers from Greenwich
English footballers
England wartime international footballers
Tottenham Hotspur F.C. players
English football managers
English expatriate football managers
Bradford (Park Avenue) A.F.C. managers
West Bromwich Albion F.C. managers
AFC Ajax managers
Sheffield Wednesday F.C. managers
Fulham F.C. managers
Ethnikos Piraeus F.C. managers
FC Barcelona managers
Sevilla FC managers
Olympiacos F.C. managers
Rodos F.C. managers
Eredivisie managers
La Liga managers
English expatriate sportspeople in the Netherlands
English expatriate sportspeople in Greece
English expatriate sportspeople in Spain
Expatriate football managers in Greece
Expatriate football managers in the Netherlands
Expatriate football managers in Spain
Northfleet United F.C. players
Association football wing halves